The Spider Woman Strikes Back is a 1946 horror film starring Gale Sondergaard, with a running time of 59 minutes. Despite the similar title and role played by Sondergaard, the film is not a sequel to the Sherlock Holmes film, The Spider Woman. In The Spider Woman, Sondergaard's character is named Adrea Spedding. This time it is Zenobia Dollard.

Plot
A young woman comes to a small rural town to serve as secretary for a blind woman, the town's wealthiest person.  The town is awash in mystery owing to the inexplicable deaths of local ranchers' cattle.  The young woman becomes entangled in a web of horror as she discovers that her employer, aided by the hideously deformed household servant, has used the blood of her predecessors to create a death serum when it is mixed with spider venom - and that her own blood is now being harvested at night, while she is in a drugged sleep, to continue the experiment.

Cast
 Gale Sondergaard as Zenobia Dollard
 Brenda Joyce as Jean Kingsley
 Kirby Grant as Hal Wentley
 Milburn Stone as Mr. Moore
 Rondo Hatton as Mario the Monster Man
 Hobart Cavanaugh as Bill Stapleton
 Tom Daly as Sam Julian
 Norman Leavitt as Tom
 Guy Beach as Cal
 Horace Murphy as Angry Older Rancher (uncredited)

Also named in the film's cast were actresses Ruth Robinson, Adda Gleason, Lois Austin, and Eula Guy.  However, their roles were omitted from the final cut.

Production
The film was announced in March 1945. It was to be the first in a series starring The Spider Woman, like the ones Universal had for Dracula and Frankenstein. It was the second time Universal had spun off a horror series from their Sherlock Holmes movies, the first being The Creeper from The Pearl of Death. The film was originally called The Spider Woman Strikes Again and was based on an original story by Eric Taylor. Ford Beebe was the original director attached. Much more production information can be found on the Tom Weaver-David Schecter audio commentary on Kino Lorber's 2021 Blu-ray release of the movie.

In September Universal announced the film would be directed by Arthur Lubin. Lubin said he "hated" the movie and did not want to do it but the studio threatened to put him on suspension otherwise. The lead roles went to Sondegaard, Brenda Joyce, Kirby Grant and Rondo Hatton.

Reception
Diabolique magazine said the film was "poorly received and helped kill off Universal’s second horror cycle. And it’s a poor movie – a confused script and inadequate casting of support roles are mostly to blame but, it must be admitted, Lubin did not seem to have a particular feel/affinity for horror material. He was probably too upbeat and happy a person – no James Whale gloominess for him."

References

Notes

External links

Review of film at Variety

1946 films
American horror films
1946 horror films
Films directed by Arthur Lubin
Universal Pictures films
1940s English-language films
1940s American films